The National Space Biomedical Research Institute (NSBRI) was a NASA-funded consortium of institutions studying the health risks related to long-duration spaceflight and developing solutions to reduce those risks. The NSBRI was founded in 1997 through a NASA Cooperative Agreement. The founding director was Laurence R. Young of MIT. NSBRI's 16,400-square-foot headquarters facility was located in the BioScience Research Collaborative in Houston, Texas. The Institute shared the facility with Baylor College of Medicine's Center for Space Medicine. The official opening was held March 19, 2012.

In March 2012 NASA announced a five-year extension of its cooperative agreement with NSBRI. At the end of this period NASA wound down its relationship with NSBRI, which closed in 2017. The consortium was succeeded by the Translational Research Institute for Space Health (TRISH), led by the Baylor College of Medicine.

Research programs
NSBRI coordinated its research with NASA's Human Research Program and contributed to its goal of reducing spaceflight risks.  In 2016 NASA described the role of the collaboration as "investigat[ing] challenges of long-duration human spaceflight and bridg[ing] the expertise of biomedical community with the scientific, engineering, and operational expertise of NASA."

In 2010 and 2011, NSBRI was the only U.S. organization to participate in the Mars-500 Project's 520-day mission simulations with an experiment that monitored the six crew members' rest-activity cycles, performance and psychological responses to determine the extent to which sleep loss, fatigue, stress, mood changes and conflicts occurred during the mission.

Research Teams
 Cardiovascular Alterations
 Human Factors and Performance
 Musculoskeletal Alterations
 Neurobehavioral and Psychosocial Factors
 Radiation Effects
 Sensorimotor Adaptation
 Smart Medical Systems and Technology

Outreach
NSBRI also had a robust education and outreach program. The NSBRI Education and Outreach team won a Stellar Award from the Rotary National Award for Space Achievement Foundation in 2007 for "performance as a nationally recognized, top-tier program that is pioneering new models for exemplary teaching, training and public outreach in support of the Vision for Space Exploration."

Consortium Members
 Baylor College of Medicine
 Brookhaven National Laboratory
 Harvard Medical School
 Johns Hopkins University
 Massachusetts Institute of Technology
 Morehouse School of Medicine
 Mount Sinai School of Medicine
 Rice University
 Texas A&M University
 University of Arkansas for Medical Sciences
 University of Pennsylvania Health System
 University of Washington

References

External links
 http://www.nasa.gov/home/hqnews/2007/oct/HQ_C07049_Cooperative_Agreement.html
 https://web.archive.org/web/20101202051347/http://humanresearch.jsc.nasa.gov/centers/nsbri.asp
 http://mars500.imbp.ru/en/partners.html
 http://www.bcm.edu/news/item.cfm?newsID=865
 
 http://www.nasa.gov/home/hqnews/2012/mar/HQ_C12-013_NSBRI_Extended.html
National Space Biomedical Research Institute

Human spaceflight
Medical research institutes in Texas
NASA
Space medicine